Santiago Sacatepéquez is a town, with a population of 24,100 (2018 census), and a municipality in the Guatemalan department of Sacatepéquez.  It is well known for a kite festival held here annually on November 1.

History

Santiago Sacatepéquez is located in a valley that the Spanish conquistadores called "de Sacatepéquez" (English: Valle of Sacatepéquez) in the 1520s. That valley was bordered by the valley of Xilotepeque on the West, those of Mixco and  las Vacas on the North, and by the Chiquimula province and the South and East. The town was described as a rich town with several hundred families and as having "cold climate" by Irish friar Thomas Gage in his 1648 book about his travels through America in the 1620s and 1630s.

In the 1540s, bishop Francisco Marroquín split the ecclesiastical administration of the central valley of Guatemala between the Order of Preachers and the Franciscans, assigning Sumpango's curato to the former.  In 1638, the Dominicans separated their large doctrines in groups revolving around six convents:

Ecclesiastic historian Domingo Juarros wrote that in 1754, by virtue of a royal order of the borbon reforms of king Carlos III all curatos and doctrines of the regular clergy were moved on to the secular clergy.  Also, in 1766 the Chimaltenango and Sacatepéquez municipalities tried to join, but it did not work out and they remained split until after independence from Spain in 1821.

Education

Climate

Santiago Sacatepéquez has a subtropical highland climate (Köppen: Cwb).

Geographic location

See also

Chajoma
 La Aurora International Airport

Notes and references

References

Bibliography

 
 
 

Municipalities of the Sacatepéquez Department